Daniel Ángel Cervantes Fraire (born 28 June 1990) is a Mexican professional footballer who plays as a centre-back for Liga MX club Querétaro.

Career
Cervantes debuted with Necaxa on October 16, 2010, in a match against Guadalajara.

Cervantes has also participated with the Mexico national under-17 team in 2007.

External links
 Daniel Cervantes at Ascenso MX 
 
 
 
 
 

1990 births
Living people
Footballers from Aguascalientes
Association football central defenders
Mexican footballers
Club Necaxa footballers
Club América footballers
Lobos BUAP footballers
Alebrijes de Oaxaca players
Liga MX players
Ascenso MX players